Eastern Hutt is a former New Zealand parliamentary electorate from 1978 to 1996. It was represented by two Labour MPs.

Population centres
The 1977 electoral redistribution was the most overtly political since the Representation Commission had been established through an amendment to the Representation Act in 1886, initiated by Muldoon's National Government. As part of the 1976 census, a large number of people failed to fill out an electoral re-registration card, and census staff had not been given the authority to insist on the card being completed. This had little practical effect for people on the general roll, but it transferred Māori to the general roll if the card was not handed in. Together with a northward shift of New Zealand's population, this resulted in five new electorates having to be created in the upper part of the North Island. The electoral redistribution was very disruptive, and 22 electorates were abolished, while 27 electorates were newly created (including Eastern Hutt) or re-established.

In the 1977 electoral redistribution, the existing Western Hutt moved west, and the Eastern Hutt electorate was formed from areas that previously belonged to Western Hutt and the  electorate, the latter of which was abolished. The Eastern Hutt electorate incorporated the eastern part of Lower Hutt in the Hutt Valley up to the suburb of Haywards in the north. In the 1983 electoral redistribution, the northern part of the electorate transferred to the Western Hutt electorate (including Haywards) and the electorate moved slightly further east.

History
In the 1978 election, the Eastern Hutt electorate was won by Trevor Young, who had been MP for the Hutt electorate since 1968. When Eastern Hutt was replaced in 1996 by the  electorate, Swain transferred to the  electorate to the north of Hutt South.

Members of Parliament
The electorate was represented by two Labour MPs.

Key

Election results

1993 election

1990 election

1987 election

1984 election

1981 election

1978 election

Notes

References

Historical electorates of New Zealand
Lower Hutt
1978 establishments in New Zealand
1996 disestablishments in New Zealand
Politics of the Wellington Region